Catch as catch can may refer to:

Catch wrestling, also known as Catch As Catch Can Wrestling
Catch as Catch Can (album), a 1983 album by Kim Wilde
Catch as Catch Can: The Collected Stories and Other Writings, by Joseph Heller
Catch-As-Catch-Can (1927 film), an American film directed by Charles Hutchison
Catch as Catch Can (1937 film), a British film starring James Mason
Catch as Catch Can (1967 film), an Italian film
"Catch as Catch Can", an episode of the TV series WordGirl

See also
Catch as Cash Can, an episode of DuckTales
Catch as Cats Can, a 1947 animated cartoon featuring caricatures of Frank Sinatra and Bing Crosby